Zarrin Rural District is a rural district (dehestan) in Atamalek District, Jowayin County, Razavi Khorasan Province, Iran. According to the 2006 census, its population was 3,156, with 814 families.  The rural district has six villages.

References 

Rural Districts of Razavi Khorasan Province
Joveyn County